Megalopoli is a town in the southwestern part of the regional unit of Arcadia, southern Greece. It is located in the same site as ancient Megalopolis ( literally large/great city). When it was founded in 371 BC, it was the first large urbanization in rustic Arcadia. Its theater had a capacity of 20,000 visitors, making it one of the largest ancient Greek theaters.

Today Megalopoli has several schools, shops, churches, hotels and other services. The population of Megalopoli in 2011 was 5,779 residents.

Geography

Megalopoli is situated in a wide valley, surrounded by mountains: the Taygetus to the south, the Mainalo to the north, the Tsemperou to the southeast and the Lykaion to the west. Its elevation is 430 m above sea level. The river Alfeios flows through this valley, coming from the east and flowing to the north, passing south and west of the town. Its tributary Elissonas passes north of the town. The large lignite deposits around Megalopoli are being exploited by open-pit mining. The Megalopoli Power Plant, 3 km northwest of the town centre, has produced electricity from this lignite since 1969.

The A7 motorway connects Megalopoli with Kalamata and Tripoli, replacing the Greek National Road 7. The Greek National Road 7 connects Megalopoli with Pyrgos via Karytaina and Andritsaina. The railway from Corinth to Kalamata passes 4 km south of the town. Megalopoli is 24 km southwest of Tripoli, 41 km north of Kalamata, 45 km northwest of Sparti and 68 km southeast of Pyrgos.

History

Megalopolis is known for its ancient ruins situated northwest of the town centre, on both banks of the river Elisson. Other landmarks include the Thersileon with 67 pillars and a temple. Herodotus reported the ancient belief that the Megalopolis area was a battleground of the Titanomachy. The foundation for this apparently was the presence of lignite deposits, which are prone to catch fire in summer and can smoulder and scorch the earth for weeks (Zeus is supposed to have slain the Titans with lightning bolts; see also below), coupled with the presence of fossil bones of prehistoric elephants and rhinoceroses. Herodotus informs his readers that the bones of "Titans" were exhibited in various places in the surrounding area at least since the 5th century BC.

The city was founded through a synodical of twenty to forty neighbouring communities between 371 and 368 BC by the Arcadian League in an attempt to form a political counterweight to Sparta. Megalopolis was a member of the Arcadian League after its foundation until the dissolution of the federation in 362 BC. In 353 BC, when Thebes had her hands full with the so-called Sacred War, the Spartans made an attempt to reduce Megalopolis; but the Thebans sent assistance and the city was rescued. In 331 BC, Megalopolis was invaded by the Spartans and there was a battle with the Macedonians that came to Megalopolis' help. In 317 BC at the start of the Second War of the Diadochi, Polyperchon, the new Regent of the Macedonian Empire, besieged Megalopolis which had sided with his enemy Cassander. The siege failed.

In the 270s BC, Aristodamos the Good managed to take control over the city as a tyrant backed by Macedon. In 235 BC, the second tyrant of the city, Lydiades, gave up control over the polis and the city became a member of the Achaean League. In 222 BC, the Spartan king Cleomenes III burnt down the city but it was rebuilt in the years after the destruction.

As a member of the Achaean League, Megalopolis had a profound influence on the federal politics and it was the hometown of several notable Achaean figures such as Philopoemen, Lykortas and Polybius. The city remained populated under the Romans but by the 6th century it was almost completely abandoned. During the Byzantine era, and later also the Ottoman, the town on the same place was called Sináno (Σινάνο). It was renamed Megalopoli after the Greek War of Independence.

Megalopoli retained a rural character until the early 1960s, when with the help of Megalopoli-born Prof. Leonidas Zervas (then Minister of Industry) the Greek Public Power Corporation started mining lignite in the Megalopoli Mine and the construction of the Megalopoli Power Plant followed soon. The town was struck by the massive Arcadia earthquake of 5 April 1965, in which 17 inhabitants were killed and 80% of residences were demolished or rendered uninhabitable.

Municipality
The municipality Megalopoli was formed at the 2011 local government reform by the merger of the following three former municipalities, that became municipal units:
Falaisia
Gortyna
Megalopoli

The municipality has an area of 722.629 km2, the municipal unit 331.498 km2.

Subdivisions

The municipal unit of Megalopoli is subdivided into the following communities (villages within the community in brackets):
Anthochori
Ano Karyes
Chirades
Choremis (Choremis, Apiditsa)
Chranoi
Gefyra
Isaris (Isaris, Petrovouni, Chrousa)
Isoma Karyon
Karatoulas
Kastanochori
Kato Karyes
Lykaio
Lykochia
Lykosoura
Makrysi (Makrysi, Kato Makrysi)
Mallota
Marathoussa
Megalopoli (Megalopoli, Oresteio)
Nea Ekklisoula
Neochori Lykosouras
Paradeisia (Paradeisia, Fanaiti)
Perivolia (Perivolia, Vrysoules)
Plaka
Rapsommati
Souli (Souli, Derveni)
Soulos
Thoknia
Trilofo (Trilofo, Palaiomoiri)
Tripotamo
Vangos
Vastas

Province
The province of Megalopoli was one of the provinces of the Messenia Prefecture. Its territory corresponded with that of the current municipality Megalopoli, except the municipal unit Gortyna. It was abolished in 2006.

Population

Notable people 
Chaeron of Megalopolis (4th century BC), envoy of Philip II of Macedon
Cercidas (3rd century BC), Cynic philosopher and poet
Philopoemen (253–183 BC), general and statesman
Polybius (c. 203–120 BC), historian
Leonidas Zervas (1902–1980), Greek chemist

See also
List of settlements in Arcadia

References

External links

3rd Megalopolis Public School (in Greek)
GTP – Municipality of Megalopoli

 
Municipalities of Peloponnese (region)
Populated places in Arcadia, Peloponnese
371 BC
Populated places established in the 4th century BC
Arcadian city-states
Theban hegemony
Provinces of Greece
370s BC establishments